Stepdad is an American electronic/pop band based in Grand Rapids, Michigan.

History
Originally a duo, Stepdad was formed in Chicago, Illinois during the summer of 2009 when Mark Tafel and Ryan McCarthy, who were roommates at the time, began writing songs together in their apartment. They initially gained exposure in early 2010 when they composed a theme song for the popular web comic "Axe Cop".  The duo's song became the official theme song for the "Axe Cop" comic and motion comic.

In April 2010, the band released their first EP, Ordinaire, independently via Bandcamp. The EP spawned two singles, "Jungles" and "My Leather, My Fur, My Nails".

In June 2012, Stepdad released their debut LP, Wildlife Pop, under Black Bell Records. The album was recorded with producer Chris Zane.

Use in other media
"My Leather, My Fur, My Nails" was featured in the series finale of the television show Weeds.
"My Leather, My Fur, My Nails" also appears in the 2016 movie Beautiful Prison
"Jungles" appears in the EA Sports video game FIFA 13.
"Treasure Hugs" appears in the Ubisoft video game STEEP.
"Pick & Choose" and "Warrior" were featured in Season 6, Episode 4 of Gossip Girl.
"Must Land Running" was featured in a national BMW TV commercial called "Moments" that began airing in December 2013.
"Find Love" was featured in Season 2, Episode 14 of The Mindy Project.
"Warrior" was featured in Season 2, Episode 7 of the MTV series Teen Wolf.
"Parrot" and "Cutie Boots" have been used regularly as bump music on Adult Swim.

Discography
 Ordinaire EP (2010)
 Wildlife Pop (2012)
 Strange Tonight EP (2014)
 Masterbeast Theatre EP (2016)

References

External links 
 

Electronic music groups from Michigan